Central Health is the governing body for healthcare regulation in an area of the Canadian province of Newfoundland and Labrador. The area region includes the communities of:
 Fogo Island
 Gander
 Grand Falls-Windsor

In the 2022 provincial budget, the Newfoundland and Labrador Government announced its intentions to integrate the existing four health authorities into one entity. Legislation was passed in the House of Assembly approving the amalgamation in November 2022.

References

Central